The Milano City Marathon is a marathon race held every April in Milan, Italy. It was first organised in 2000 by the Milano City Marathon Club and the first nine editions were held in November.

History
The 2009 edition of the race, initially set for November 2009, was shifted to April the following year. The newly scheduled event featured a marathon, half marathon, and relay marathon event. The move proved popular and at least 7213 runners took part in the activities that year. At the 2011 edition,  the marathon and relay events saw more than five thousand participants each, making a record total of 10,203 runners.

Barclays Bank became the title sponsor in 2012 and 13569 people participated in the day's events, including the marathon and relay races.

The 20th edition of the race, originally scheduled for 2020, was postponed to 2021 due to the coronavirus pandemic and lockdown of Italy, with all registrants given the option of receiving a 100% discount code for the 20th edition, an 80% discount for the 21st, a 60% discount for the 22nd, or a 40% discount for the 23rd.

Winners 
Key:

Notes

References

List of winners
Civai, Franco (2009-11-29). Citta di Milano Marathon. Association of Road Racing Statisticians. Retrieved on 2010-04-12.

External links 
Official website
Marathoninfo

Marathons in Italy
Sports competitions in Milan
Annual sporting events in Italy
Recurring sporting events established in 2000
2000 establishments in Italy
Spring (season) events in Italy